Destruction is a German thrash metal band formed in 1982. They are often credited as one of the "Big Four" of the German thrash metal scene, the others being Kreator, Sodom and Tankard. In addition to helping pioneer black metal, Destruction was part of the second wave of thrash metal in the mid-to-late 1980s, along with American bands like Testament, Sacred Reich, Death Angel and Dark Angel. For most of the 1990s, the band was not signed to a record label and was forced to self-produce their albums until they signed a contract with Nuclear Blast in the early 2000s.

History 
The band was formed in Weil am Rhein as Knight of Demon in 1982, inspired by Iron Maiden, Mercyful Fate, Motörhead and Venom. The line-up featured Ulf Kühne on vocals, Mike Sifringer on guitar, Marcel "Schmier" Schirmer on bass and Tommy Sandmann on drums. Kühne was kicked out of the band due to conflict with Sifringer over a girl. Schmier took over vocal duties. They were then known as Destruction and released a demo titled Bestial Invasion of Hell on 10 August 1984. After this, the group signed with Steamhammer Records and released an EP titled Sentence of Death on 10 November.

The first full-length album Infernal Overkill was released in 1985, followed a year later by Eternal Devastation (1986). The trio was joined by a second guitarist, Harry Wilkens, and drummer Tommy Sandmann was replaced by Oliver Kaiser. Together they recorded the EP Mad Butcher, the third studio album Release from Agony, both released in 1987, and the first live album Live Without Sense (1989). During this time, Destruction had enjoyed considerable popularity worldwide, touring relentlessly in Europe and North America, and sharing the stage with Venom, Slayer, Kreator, Sodom, Celtic Frost, Motörhead, King Diamond, Voivod, Exodus, Testament, Overkill, Death Angel, Possessed, Sacred Reich, The Cro-Mags, Tankard, Flotsam and Jetsam, Artillery, Rage, Coroner, Assassin, Candlemass, Prong, Accu§er, Iron Angel, Wolfsbane and Girlschool.

In 1989, during the initial recording sessions of the fourth studio album Cracked Brain, Schmier was fired from the band and was replaced by Poltergeist frontman André Grieder, the only album with him. The album was released in 1990. Guitarist Mike Sifringer remained and continued to release material under the moniker of "Neo-Destruction", featuring vocalist Thomas Rosenmerkel, second guitarist Michael Piranio, bassist Christian Engler and continuing drummer Oliver Kaiser. The first recording was the self-titled Destruction EP in 1994, followed by the Them Not Me EP in 1995 and the album The Least Successful Human Cannonball in 1998.

In 1999, the line-up was disassembled and Schmier rejoined with the addition of new drummer Sven Vormann, returning Destruction as a trio. They signed a record deal with Nuclear Blast and released three new albums; All Hell Breaks Loose in 2000, The Antichrist in 2001, and Metal Discharge in 2003, with Marc Reign replacing Vormann. The second live album Alive Devastation was released on 26 March 2003, followed by the release of a live DVD titled Live Discharge: 20 Years of Total Destruction on 4 March 2004. Reign was temporarily arrested on 24 May 2004 following the band's performance in Brescia due to the stage accessories, which was confiscated as a result. Destruction would then sign with AFM Records and release Inventor of Evil on 22 August 2005. That album was followed a compilation album titled Thrash Anthems on 19 January 2007, featuring re-recorded material, and the next studio album D.E.V.O.L.U.T.I.O.N. on 29 August 2008. The third live album The Curse of the Antichrist: Live in Agony was released 25 September 2009, followed by the second DVD release A Savage Symphony - The History of Annihilation on 29 January 2010.

Drummer Marc Reign would leave the band in 2010 and be replaced by Polish drummer Wawrzyniec "Vaaver" Dramowicz. On 18 February 2011, the twelfth album Day of Reckoning was released. The band's thirteenth studio album Spiritual Genocide was released on 23 November 2012. Their next album Under Attack was released on 13 May 2016. Through an exclusive PledgeMusic campaign, Destruction released the sequel album to Thrash Anthems titled Thrash Anthems II on 18 July 2017, featuring more re-recordings of classic songs.

On 23 January 2018, Vaaver left Destruction "for family reasons", according to Schmier. He took time off in 2015 to be with his family following the birth of his second child. Randy Black would temporarily replace him until the band finds a "worthy successor". He was later announced as the band's new drummer. On 28 February 2019, Swiss guitarist Damir Eskic joined the band. This new lineup recorded the fifteenth studio album Born to Perish, which was released on 9 August 2019. It is rooted in their traditional style of thrash metal and received good reviews. The fifth live album Born to Thrash was released on 8 May 2020.

On 16 July 2021, Destruction performed at the Area 53 Festival in Leoben without rhythm guitarist Mike Sifringer. Schmier explained in a Facebook post that Sifringer had not answered his emails and questioned his status, and that there was a problem that led to the decision to continue without him and would release a statement planned for 19 August. Sifringer's departure was confirmed that day and was replaced by new guitarist Martin Furia, followed by the release of a new single titled "State of Apathy", featuring the band's first recording appearance with Furia. On 13 August, the sixth live album Live Attack was released. On 16 December, a music video of the title track from the sixteenth studio album Diabolical was released. The album was released on 8 April 2022 in celebration of the band's 40th anniversary.

Members 
Current
 Marcel "Schmier" Schirmer – bass (1982–1989, 1999–present), lead vocals (1984–1989, 1999–present)
 Randy Black – drums (2018–present)
 Damir Eskic – lead guitar, backing vocals (2019–present)
 Martin Furia – rhythm guitar, backing vocals (2021–present)

Former
 Mike Sifringer – rhythm guitar (1982–1989, 1990–2021), lead guitar (1982–1987, 1990–1993, 1999–2019), bass (1989–1993)
 Tommy Sandmann – drums (1982–1987)
 Ulf – vocals (1982–1984)
 Oliver "Olly" Kaiser – drums (1987–1999)
 Harry Wilkens – lead guitar (1987–1990), rhythm guitar (1989–1990)
 André Grieder – lead vocals (1989–1990)
 Thomas Rosenmerkel – vocals (1993–1999)
 Michael "Ano" Piranio – lead guitar (1993–1999)
 Christian Engler – bass (1993–1999)
 Sven Vormann – drums (1999–2001)
 Marc Reign – drums, backing vocals (2001–2010)
 Wawrzyniec "Vaaver" Dramowicz – drums, backing vocals (2010–2018)

Timeline

Discography 

 Infernal Overkill (1985)
 Eternal Devastation (1986)
 Release from Agony (1987)
 Cracked Brain (1990)
 The Least Successful Human Cannonball (1998)
 All Hell Breaks Loose (2000)
 The Antichrist (2001)
 Metal Discharge (2003)
 Inventor of Evil (2005)
 D.E.V.O.L.U.T.I.O.N. (2008)
 Day of Reckoning (2011)
 Spiritual Genocide (2012)
 Under Attack (2016)
 Born to Perish (2019)
 Diabolical (2022)

References

External links 

 
 
 Destruction at Nuclear Blast
 

1982 establishments in Germany
German thrash metal musical groups
Political music groups
Musical groups established in 1982
Musical quartets
Napalm Records artists